Dizaj-e Hasan Beyg (also Romanized as Dīzaj-e Ḩasan Beyg) is a village in Dizajrud-e Sharqi Rural District, Qaleh Chay District, Ajab Shir County, East Azerbaijan Province, Iran. At the 2006 census, its population was 615, in 117 families.

References 

Populated places in Ajab Shir County